Mount Freya is a prominent peak east of Mount Thor in the Asgard Range of Victoria Land, Antarctica. It was named by the Victoria University of Wellington Antarctic Expedition (1958–59) after the Norse goddess Freya.

References

Mountains of the Asgard Range
McMurdo Dry Valleys